Arbor Preparatory High School, or for short, Arbor Prep is a public, charter high school located in Ypsilanti. Arbor Preparatory High School is a comprehensive high school serving 9-12th grades. It has 285 students  and 40 faculty members. The building's construction was finished in 2011, and opened the same year. As of late 2020, the school is now owned and operated by National Heritage Academies.

See also
National Heritage Academies
Taylor Preparatory High School
Wellspring Preparatory High School

References

Schools in Washtenaw County, Michigan
Charter schools in Michigan
Educational institutions established in 2011
2011 establishments in Michigan